Bloomfield is an unincorporated community and census-designated place in Ellington and Mendon Townships, Adams County, Illinois, United States.

Bloomfield was platted ca. 1837.

Geography 

Demographics
As of the 2020 census there were 32 people, 18 households, and 18 families residing in the CDP. The racial makeup of the CDP was 96.88% White, and 3.13% from other races.

References

Unincorporated communities in Adams County, Illinois
Unincorporated communities in Illinois